Geniostoma umbellatum is a species of plant in the Loganiaceae family. It is endemic to Papua New Guinea.

References

Flora of Papua New Guinea
umbellatum
Vulnerable plants
Taxonomy articles created by Polbot